The Chinga meteorite is an iron meteorite. It is structurally an ataxite with very rare kamacite lamella. The meteoric iron is a part of the lamella taenite. The total chemical composition is 82.8% iron, 16.6% nickel, and the rest mostly cobalt and phosphorus.

History

Fragments of the meteorite were found in 1913 by gold diggers in Tuva near the Chinge River after which it is named.

No impact structure was found. Studies from the fluvial deposits in which the meteorites was found estimate that it fell about 10,000 to 20,000 years ago. It burst during passage through the atmosphere, the pieces impacting on a glacier.

 pieces of the Chinga meteorite were on sale for /g.

Classification
The Chinga meteorite was classified as an IVB meteorite (Subgroup "an") in 2000, but was reclassified as an Iron ungrouped (Iron-ung) in 2006.

In culture
The Iron Man is a statue that was possibly made from a fragment of the Chinga meteorite.

Researchers say the 1,000-year-old object with a swastika on its stomach is made from a rare form of iron with a high content of nickel.

References

See also
 Glossary of meteoritics
 

Iron meteorites
Meteorites found in Russia